Libera Me (en: "Set Me Free") is the third album (not including the English version, The Dark Side) by Spanish power metal band DarkSun, released on September 29, 2008.

Libera Me was produced by lead vocalist Daniel González. David Figueiras performed the lead guitars, now that González has left the guitars and centred mainly on vocal duties. The drums were played by former member Dani Cabal, who played on the band's first album, El Legado, and returned to the group from 2007 to 2008, being replaced by current drummer José Ojeda. The keyboards were played by Ana Fernandes, who replaced Víctor Fernández after leaving in the summer of 2007. "Miedo" was the first single for the album and also the new video clip of the band, which was directed and produced by Jacinto Hinojal. The album contained special features, like the video clip, pictures of the making of. The cover was created by Daniel Alonso, who has also worked for bands like WarCry and Hard Spirit, among others.

Track listing
Libera Me
Para siempre
Miedo
Huellas en la Arena
Tan Lejos
La Sombra tras el Cristal
Voces en la Oscuridad
Lágrimas de un Ángel
Saltar al Vacío
Libre como el Amanecer
Alma
Odio Eterno

Members 
Dani González - vocals
Tino Hevia - guitars
David Figueiras - guitars
Pedro Junquera - bass
Ana Fernández - keyboards
Daniel Cabal - drums

External links
DarkSun Website

2008 albums
DarkSun albums